The 1976 Asian Taekwondo Championships were the 2nd edition of the Asian Taekwondo Championships, and were held in Melbourne, Australia from 16 to 17 October, 1976.

Medal summary

Medal table

References

Results

External links
WT Official Website

Asian Championships
Asian Taekwondo Championships
Asian Taekwondo Championships
Taekwondo Championships
October 1976 sports events in Australia
Taekwondo in Australia